Clement Banda is a Zambian footballer. He competed in the men's tournament at the 1980 Summer Olympics.

References

Year of birth missing (living people)
Living people
Zambian footballers
Zambia international footballers
Olympic footballers of Zambia
Footballers at the 1980 Summer Olympics
Place of birth missing (living people)
Association football midfielders